Jack Robert Hillen (born January 24, 1986) is an American former professional ice hockey defenseman. Undrafted, Hillen played in the NHL for the New York Islanders, Nashville Predators, Washington Capitals and Carolina Hurricanes.

Playing career

Minor/collegiate
Hillen grew up in Minnetonka, Minnesota, and played youth hockey in the Hopkins Youth Hockey Association. Before entering Colorado College, Hillen played high school hockey for the Academy of Holy Angels in Minnesota.

During his senior year at Colorado College, he won the Defenseman of the Year and first team all Western Collegiate Hockey Association (WCHA). After playing four seasons with the Tigers ice hockey team, graduating with a Bachelor's degree in economics, he was signed as an undrafted free agent by the New York Islanders on a two-year contract.

Professional
Hillen made his NHL debut on April 3, 2008, with the Islanders in the second-last game of the 2007–08 season against the New York Rangers. He then scored his first career point in his second NHL game, on April 4 and also against the Rangers, recording an assist on a Miroslav Šatan goal.

On January 26, 2010, whilst playing in a home game at Nassau Veterans Memorial Coliseum against the Washington Capitals, Hillen took a direct hit to the face from an Alexander Ovechkin slapshot. Hillen was able to leave the ice under his own power with a trainer attempting to stop the bleeding. He was later transported to a hospital, where he had surgery for a broken jaw and tooth damage; he missed six weeks of action as a result of the injury.

On August 8, 2011, Hillen signed as a free agent on a one-year, two-way contract with the Nashville Predators. During the 2011–12 season, Hillen contributed with six points in 55 games for the Predators.

On July 2, 2012, as a free agent for the second consecutive year, he signed a one-year, one-way contract with the Washington Capitals. After suffering an injury on the opening night of the lockout-shortened 2012–13 season, Hillen later returned to help in the Capitals resurgence, posting nine points in 23 games. On April 2, 2013, he signed a two-year, $1.4 million contract extension with Washington.

On October 3, 2013, a hit from Calgary Flames forward Lance Bouma rammed Hillen into the boards, where he fell awkwardly and had to be helped off the ice after being attended by trainers for several minutes. He successfully underwent surgery to his right leg  on October 5 to repair his tibial plateau, the top part of the tibia that lies underneath the knee. He was expected to miss four-to-six months. Continuing his string of bad luck, on March 25, 2014, Hillen collided with Alexander Ovechkin and was knocked unconscious.

In the midst of his third season with the Capitals in 2014–15, Hillen produced five points in 35 games as a depth defender before he was traded, along with a fourth-round pick in 2015, to the Carolina Hurricanes in exchange for Tim Gleason on February 28, 2015.

As a free agent Hillen was unable to attain a NHL contract, and having sustained several injuries opted to retire from professional hockey midway into the following season on December 30, 2015.

Career statistics

Regular season and playoffs

International

Awards and honors

References

External links

1986 births
Living people
American men's ice hockey defensemen
Carolina Hurricanes players
Colorado College Tigers men's ice hockey players
Hershey Bears players
Ice hockey players from Minnesota
Nashville Predators players
New York Islanders players
Sportspeople from Portland, Oregon
Tri-City Storm players
Undrafted National Hockey League players
Washington Capitals players
AHCA Division I men's ice hockey All-Americans